Aporocidaris is a genus of sea urchins in the family Ctenocidaridae. Several species are found in deep water in circum-Antarctic locations.

Characteristics
The test is rather compressed, with a flat base and thin fragile plates, and the apical system is conspicuously domed. The primary spines are long and very slender and the secondary spines are cylindrical and erect.

Species
The following species are recognised by the World Register of Marine Species:
Aporocidaris antarctica Mortensen, 1909
Aporocidaris eltaniana Mooi, David, Fell & Choné, 2000
Aporocidaris fragilis Agassiz & Clark, 1907
Aporocidaris incerta (Koehler, 1902)
Aporocidaris milleri (Agassiz, 1898)
Aporocidaris usarpi Mooi, David, Fell & Choné, 2000

References 

Ctenocidaridae
Cidaroida genera
Taxa named by Hubert Lyman Clark